NTC may refer to:

Education
 Fort Irwin National Training Center, U.S. Army training
 Luther W. New Jr. Theological College, Dehradun, India
 National Taitung Junior College, a college in Taitung County, Taiwan
 National Technology Council (Pakistan)
National Teachers College, in the Philippines
 National Trade Certificate Foundation, in Mauritius
 Nazarene Theological College (England)
 New Teacher Center, in the U.S.
 Northcentral Technical College, in the U.S.
 Northfleet Technology College, in the U.K.
 The Nautical Training Corps, in the U.K.

Government
 National Tracing Center, firearms tracing facility in the U.S.
 National Transitional Council (Congo), political body in Africa
 National Transitional Council, the provisional government of Libya, August 2011–August 2012
 National Transport Commission, an Australian statutory body created to develop regulatory and operational reform for road, rail and intermodal transport.
 White House National Trade Council, established by President Donald Trump
 No-trade clause

Telecommunications
 Nepal Telecom, a telecommunication service provider in Nepal
 NTC Televisión, a broadcaster in Colombia
 National Telecommunications Commission
, Turkey

Other
 Negative temperature coefficient, often referring to a thermistor of that type
 National Transport Corporation, a state run transport company in Mauritius
 National Trade Center, a skyscraper in Taichung, Taiwan.
 National Tennis Centre (United Kingdom)
 National Textile Corporation, India
 Nourseothricin, an antibiotic
 Nan Tan Computer, the former name of Clevo

See also
 National Takaful Company (disambiguation)
 National Tennis Centre (disambiguation)